Sikur is an administrative district in East Lombok Regency, Indonesia.

Districts of East Lombok Regency